JBTV (a.k.a. JBTV Music Television) is a Chicago-area broadcast, weekly 60-minute music television show featuring live in-studio performances, music videos, and music-related interviews from emerging and established musicians. Based in Chicago, Illinois, JBTV has over a 30-year history. It was created and hosted by Jerry Bryant in 1986. As of the show's 32nd season, Jerry Bryant and Greg Corner are the show's main hosts.

The show is broadcast locally on WJYS-TV in Chicago on Saturday at 1am CT, on both the main channel at 62.1, and the third sub-channel at 62.4, which carries Heartland, with re-broadcast on Wednesday at 11:30pm CT on the second sub-channel at 62.3, which carries Charge!. It posts all of its aired content on its website, as well as exclusive, live streams of in-studio performances and behind-the-scenes footage showcasing visiting bands and the show's production team.

Format

Original format (1986–2016)

In its original format a band or solo performer would visit the JBTV studio for an interview with owner and host Jerry Bryant, selecting a number of music videos (both the artist's and their own favorite videos) that would be shown in the aired episode. JBTV is currently on broadcast television WJYS-62 in Chicago Wednesday nights at 11pm with New Music Videos and live JBTV performances. JBTV is currently hosting live in-studio performances with new artists and established bands.

Broadcast schedule

JBTV is broadcast weekly on WJYS. Episodes air weekly on Saturday nights at 1am CT on Ch. 62.1 & 62.4, with re-airing on Wednesday nights at 11:30pm CT on Ch. 62.3

Notable guests

0-9
The 1975
311

A
Abandoned Pools
The Afghan Whigs
Against Me!
Airborne Toxic Event
Alanis Morissette
Alkaline Trio
Alpine
Alt-J
Amanda Palmer
American Authors
Andrew W.K.
Angels and Airwaves
Anti Flag
Apocalyptica
Ariana and the Rose
Arkells
Atlas Genius
Awolnation

B
Bad Religion
Band of Skulls
Banks
Barcelona
Barenaked Ladies
Bastille
Battleme
Bear Hands
Bear Mountain
Ben Folds Five
Beware of Darkness
Biffy Clyro
Big Data
Billy Corgan
Björk
Bleachers
Bosnian Rainbows
BTS
Bowling for Soup
Brick + Mortar
Bullet For My Valentine

C
Cage the Elephant
Cake
Charli XCX
Cheap Trick
Chris Isaak
Cold War Kids

D
Dan Black
The Dandy Warhols
Dave Matthews Band
A Day To Remember
Disturbed
Dead Sara
Dead To Me
Death Cab for Cutie
Dredg
Dropkick Murphys

E
Eagulls
EL VY
Emilie Autumn
Erasure
Everclear

F
Fall Out Boy
Finch
Finger Eleven
Fitz and the Tantrums
The Flaming Lips
Flatfoot 56
Flobots
Foster the People
Fountains of Wayne
Foxy Shazam
Freelance Whales

G
Garbage
Gary Numan
The Gaslight Anthem
Goldfinger
Goo Goo Dolls
Green Day
Grouplove

H
Hippo Campus
Hot Hot Heat
Hozier

I
I:Scintilla
I Fight Dragons
Imagine Dragons
Incubus
INXS

J
J Roddy Walston and the Business
Janus
JC Brooks & the Uptown Sound
Jeff Buckley
Jewel
Jimmy Eat World
JR JR
Juliana Hatfield
July Talk

K
Kate Bush
K.Flay
Kill Hannah
Kongos

L
Ladyhawke
The Lawrence Arms
Less Than Jake
Local H
Lucky Boys Confusion

M
Maps & Atlases
Martin Atkins
Megadeth
The Menzingers
MGMT
Minus the Bear
Moby
Moving Units
The Mowgli's

N
Ned's Atomic Dustbin
Niki and the Dove
Nneka
No Doubt
NOFX

O
Oasis
OK Go
Of Mice & Men
Of Monsters and Men
The Offspring
The Orwells

P
Panic! at the Disco
Papa Roach
The Peach Kings
Phoebe Ryan
Pearl Jam
Phantogram
PJ Harvey
Plain White Ts
Portugal. The Man
Poster Children

R
Radiohead
Joey Ramone
Rise Against
Riverboat Gamblers
Henry Rollins

S
Semi Precious Weapons
The Shins
Silverchair
Silversun Pickups
Skinny Puppy
Slayer
Smashing Pumpkins
Smallpools
Smoking Popes
The So So Glos
Sonic Youth
Street Dogs
The Struts
The Sword
System of a Down

T
Taylor Bennett
They Might Be Giants
Thirty Seconds to Mars
The Ting Tings
Tori Amos
Tove Lo
Trashcan Sinatras
Twenty One Pilots
Twin Peaks

U
Unwritten Law

V
The Verve

W
The Whigs
Wilco
The Wombats

X
X Ambassadors

Y
Yelawolf

Z
Zwan

Awards
Billboard - Best Local/Regional Alternative Modern Rock Show (Twice)
Chicago/Midwest Emmy-Outstanding Achievement for Individual Excellence Off Camera: Art Direction and Graphics/Animation - 2010
Chicago/Midwest Emmy-2014 Silver Circle recipient for 25+ years of service

External links
 Official JBTV website

References

Local music television shows in the United States
Chicago television shows
1984 American television series debuts
American public access television shows